Joseph John Jefferson (1795–1882), usually referred to as John Jefferson, was a British Congregationalist minister and advocate for Christian pacifism.

Biography 

Historian Martin Ceadel asserts that Jefferson's pacifist position was most likely inspired by one of his congregants named John Scott. Scott died in 1832 and as minister for the Independent Meeting House at Stoke Newington, Jefferson delivered the eulogy. Jefferson was elected as secretary of the London Peace Society on 11 August 1840. In 1845, he spoke publicly in a series of lectures in London sponsored by the Society along with George Thompson, Henry Richard, and John Scoble. The lecture series was attended by a total of 64,000 people. Jefferson hoped they would spread Christian pacifism, specifically opposition to all wars as a Christian principle. In 1846, he was one of the first sixty signers of the League of Universal Brotherhood Pledge, along with Joseph Sturge and James Silk Buckingham. He was also active within the Congregational Union and the London Missionary Society. He retired suddenly as secretary of the Peace Society on 4 January 1848 due to poor health, but shortly afterwards in May 1848 he was made vice-president of the Society. He lived for another 34 years and remained an inactive vice-president until his death in 1882. Jefferson served as the minister for Abney Park Chapel and cemetery in Stoke Newington for more than a quarter of a century.

Works

Citations

References

Further reading 
  - A rebuttal of 

1795 births
1882 deaths
19th-century Congregationalist ministers
British Christian pacifists
British Congregationalist ministers
British Christian writers